Sir Peter Prideaux, 3rd Baronet (1626–1705), of Netherton in the parish of Farway, near Honiton, Devon, was an English politician.

Origins
He was the 4th but eldest surviving son and heir of Sir Peter Prideaux, 2nd Baronet (1596–1682), of Netherton, MP for Honiton in 1661 and Sheriff of Devon in 1662, by his wife Susan Paulet (d. 1673), daughter of Sir Anthony Paulet (1562–1600) of Hinton St George, Somerset, Governor of Jersey, and sister of John Poulett, 1st Baron Poulett (born c. 1585).

Career
He was elected Member of Parliament for Liskeard, Cornwall, in 1661, but chose to sit for Honiton in place of his father (who stood down in his favour after having been elected himself). He was several years later returned for St Mawes on 22 June 1685.

Marriage and children
In 1645 he married Elizabeth Grenville (d. 1692), eldest daughter of Sir Bevil Grenville (1596–1643) lord of the manors of Bideford in Devon and Stowe, Kilkhampton in Cornwall and sister of John Granville, 1st Earl of Bath. By his wife he had 4 sons and 6 daughters including:
Sir Edmund Prideaux, 4th Baronet (1647–1720), eldest son and heir, of Netherton.
Peter Prideaux (1651–1712), 2nd son, who was educated at Exeter College, Oxford and was later a Fellow of All Souls, Oxford. He died unmarried.
John Prideaux (1655–1706) of Solden, Holsworthy, 3rd son, MP for Newport, Cornwall in 1700. He was educated at Exeter College, Oxford. He married firstly his cousin Anne Prideaux (d. 1703), daughter and heiress of Humphrey Prideaux of Soldon, and secondly to Katherine Kelland, daughter of John Kelland of Painsford and widow of John Coffin of Portledge, Alwington. He died childless.
Roger Prideaux (1657–1685), 4th son, educated at Exeter College, Oxford

Death, burial & monument

He died on 22 November 1705 and was buried two days later in St Michael's Church, Farway, where survives his mural monument.

References

1626 births
1705 deaths
Baronets in the Baronetage of England
Members of the Parliament of England (pre-1707) for Honiton
English MPs 1661–1679
English MPs 1685–1687